The 1913 Leix by-election was held on 9 June 1913.  The by-election was held due to the death of the incumbent Irish Parliamentary MP, Patrick Aloysius Meehan.  It was won by his son the Irish Parliamentary candidate Patrick Joseph Meehan, who was unopposed.

References

1913 elections in Ireland
By-elections to the Parliament of the United Kingdom in Queen's County constituencies
1913 elections in the United Kingdom
Unopposed by-elections to the Parliament of the United Kingdom (need citation)